The 2022 BYU Cougars softball team represents Brigham Young University in the 2022 NCAA Division I softball season.  Gordon Eakin enters the year as head coach of the Cougars for a 20th consecutive season. 2022 is the ninth season for the Cougars as members of the WCC in softball. The Cougars enter 2022 having won their last 12 conference championships and having been picked as the favorites to win the 2022 WCC title.

2022 Roster

Schedule 

|-
! style=""| UNLV Rebel Classic
|- 

|- align="center" bgcolor="ffbbb"
| February 10 || at UNLV || – || Eller Media Stadium  || YouTube || 3–5 || Jenny Bressler (1–0) || Autumn Moffat-Korth (0–1) || Jasmine Martin (1) || N/A || 0–1 || –
|- bgcolor="#ccffcc"
| February 11 || vs. Cal State Bakersfield || – || Eller Media Stadium || YouTube || 13–4 (5) || Carley Brown (1–0) || Kirsten Martinez (0–1) || None || N/A || 1–1 || –
|- align="center" bgcolor="ccffcc"
| February 11 || vs. Hawai'i || – || Eller Media Stadium || YouTube || 2–1 || Chloe Temples (1–0) || Chloe Borges (0–1) || None || N/A || 2–1 || –
|- bgcolor="#ccffcc"
| February 12 || vs. Cal State Bakersfield || – || Eller Media Stadium  || YouTube || 11–2 (5) || Carley Brown (2–0) || Kaycie Kennedy (0–1) || None || 112 || 3–1 || –
|- align="center" bgcolor="ccffcc"
| February 12 || vs. Hawai'i || – || Eller Media Stadium  || YouTube || 4–1 || Autumn Moffat-Korth (1–1) || Brianna Lopez (1–2) || None|| 251 || 4–1 || –

|-
! style=""| Stanford Classic
|- 

|- align="center" bgcolor="ccffccc"
| February 17 || at Stanford || – || Boyd & Jill Smith Family Stadium || P12+ STAN || 4–3 || Autumn Moffat-Korth (2–1) || Alana Vawter (2–2) || None || 311 || 5–1 || –
|- align="center" bgcolor="ccffcc"
| February 17 || vs. San Jose State || – || Boyd & Jill Smith Family Stadium || P12+ STAN || 8–5 || Carley Brown (3–0) || Lacie Ham (1–2) || Autumn Moffat-Korth (1) || 152 || 6–1 || –
|- align="center" bgcolor="#ccffcc"
| February 18 || vs. UIC || – || Boyd & Jill Smith Family Stadium || P12+ STAN || 6–1 || Autumn Moffat-Korth (3–1) || Carlee Jo-Clark (1–2) || None || 150 || 7–1 || –
|- align="center" bgcolor="ccffccc"
| February 19 || vs. Seattle U || – || Boyd & Jill Smith Family Stadium || P12+ STAN || 5–2 || Autumn Moffat-Korth (4–1) || Carley Nance (0–1) || None || 110 || 8–1 || –
|-

|-
! style=""| Mary Nutter Collegiate Classic
|- 

|- align="center" bgcolor="ccffccc"
| February 24 || vs. Bethune-Cookman || – || Big League Dreams Complex || FloSoftball || 7–0 || Chloe Temples (2–0) || Halyne Gonzales (2–1) || None || N/A || 9–1 || –
|- align="center" bgcolor="ffbbb"
| February 24 || vs. #17 Tennessee || – || Big League Dreams Complex || FloSoftball || 3–10 || Ashley Rogers (3–0) || Autumn Moffat-Korth (4–2) || None || N/A || 9–2 || –
|- align="center" bgcolor="ffbbb"
| February 25 || vs. California Baptist || – || Big League Dreams Complex || FloSoftball || 3–6 || Alyssa Argomaniz (3–2) || Autumn Moffat-Korth (4–3) || Jordan Schuring (1) || N/A || 9–3 || –
|- align="center" bgcolor="ffbbb"
| February 26 || vs. Long Beach State || – || Big League Dreams Complex || FloSoftball || 2–4 || Sophia Fernandez (2–2) || Chloe Temples (2–1) || None || 655 || 9–4 || –
|-

|-
! style=""| San Diego Classic
|- 

|- align="center" bgcolor="ccffccc"
| March 3 || at San Diego State || – || SDSU Softball Stadium  || SCS Pacific || 2–1 (8) || Chloe Temples (3–1) || Dee Dee Hernandez (2–2) || None || 143 || 10–4 || –
|- align="center" bgcolor="ccffccc"
| March 4 || vs. Yale || – || Triton Stadium  ||  || 8–0(5) || Carley Brown (4–0) || Maddie Latta (0–1) || None || 137 || 11–4 || –
|- align="center" bgcolor="ccffccc"
| March 4 || at UC San Diego || – || Triton Stadium || ESPN+ || 4–1 || Chloe Temples (4–1) || Kaia Simpson (3–3) || None || 133 || 12–4 || –
|- align="center" bgcolor="ccffccc"
| March 5 || vs. Cal || – || USD Softball Complex ||  || 5–0 || Autumn Moffat-Korth (5–3) || Sona Halijian (8–1) || None || 48 || 13–4 || –
|-

|-
! style=""| Arizona State/Grand Canyon Invitational
|- 

|- align="center" bgcolor="ffbbb"
| March 10 || at Arizona State || – || Alberta B. Farrington Softball Stadium  || P12+ AZ || 0–8 (5) || Mac Morgan (8–1) || Autumn Moffat-Korth (5–4) || None || 0 || 13–5 || –
|- align="center" bgcolor="ccffccc"
| March 11 || vs. Rutgers || – || GCU Softball Stadium ||  || 11–2 (5) || Autumn Moffat-Korth (6–4) || Ashley Hitchcock (5–6) || None || 100 || 14–5 || –
|- align="center" bgcolor="ffbbb"
| March 11 || at Grand Canyon || – || GCU Softball Stadium  || ESPN+ || 0–2 || Ariel Thompson (8–2) || Chloe Temples (4–2) || None || 169 || 14–6 || – 
|- align="center" bgcolor="ccffccc"
| March 12 || vs. Ball State || – || GCU Softball Stadium  ||   || 14–5 || Carley Brown (5–0) || Emma Eubank (1–2) || None || 157 || 15–6 || –
|- align="center" bgcolor="ccccccc"
| March 12 || vs. Kansas City || – || GCU Softball Stadium  ||  || colspan=7|  Cancelled- KC flight cancelled due to bad weather

|-
! style=""| Regular Season
|- 

|- align="center" bgcolor="ccffccc"
| March 15 || Maine || – || Gail Miller Field  || byutv.org || 14–0 (5) || Carley Brown (6–0) || Gabbie Siciliano (1–4) || None || 175 || 16–6 || – 
|- align="center" bgcolor="ccffccc"
| March 17 || Idaho State || – || Gail Miller Field  || byutv.org || 5–2 || Autumn Moffat-Korth (7–4) || Emma McMurray (3–4) || Chloe Temples (1) || 125 || 17–6 || – 
|- align="center" bgcolor="ccffccc"
| March 19 || Southern Utah || – || Gail Miller Field  || BYUtv || 7–0 || Chloe Temples (5–2) || Capri Franzen (1–3) || None || 362 || 18–6 || – 
|- align="center" bgcolor="ccffccc"
| March 19 || Southern Utah || – || Gail Miller Field  || BYUtv || 8–0 (6) || Autumn Moffat-Korth (8–4) || Keimon Winston (1–14) || None || 362 || 19–6 || –  
|- align="center" bgcolor="ffbbb"
| March 21 || #12 Oregon || – || Gail Miller Field  || byutv.org || 3–9 || Raegan Breedlove (2–0) || Autumn Moffat-Korth (8–5) || None || 150 || 19–7 || –   
|- align="center" bgcolor="ccffccc"
| March 25 || Iowa State || – || Gail Miller Field  || byutv.org || 11–3 (5) || Carley Brown (7–0) || Ellie Spelhaug (5–7) || None || 312 || 20–7 || –  
|- align="center" bgcolor="ccffccc"
| March 25 ||Iowa State || – || Gail Miller Field  || byutv.org || 5–0 || Chloe Temples (6–2) || Saya Swain (6–2) || None || 312 || 21–7 || –  
|- align="center" bgcolor="ccffccc"
| March 26 || Iowa State || – || Gail Miller Field  || byutv.org || 11–7 || Chloe Temples (7–2) || Ellie Spelhaug (5–8) || None || 298 || 22–7 || –  
|- align="center" bgcolor="ffbbb"
| March 31 || New Mexico || – || Gail Miller Field  || byutv.org || 3–8 || Amber Linton (10–6) || Autumn Moffat-Korth (8–6) || None || 106 || 22–8 || –  
|- align="center" bgcolor="ccffccc"
| March 31 || New Mexico || – || Gail Miller Field  || byutv.org || 12–1 (5) || Chloe Temples (8–2) || Emma Guindon (9–4) || None || 106 || 23–8 || –  
|-

|- align="center" bgcolor="ccffccc"
| April 1 || New Mexico || – || Gail Miller Field  || byutv.org || 17–1 (5) || Autumn Moffat-Korth (9–6) || Amber Linton (10–7) || None || 386 || 24–8 || – 
|- align="center" bgcolor="ccccccc"
| April 5 || at Utah || – || Dumke Family Softball Field  || P12+ UTAH || colspan=7| PPD until May 3
|- align="center" bgcolor="ccffccc"
| April 8 || Loyola Marymount* || – || Gail Miller Field  || BYUtv || 4–0 || Autumn Moffat-Korth (10–6) || Jenna Perez (10–6) || None || 346 || 25–8 || 1–0 
|- align="center" bgcolor="ffbbb"
| April 8 || Loyola Marymount* || – || Gail Miller Field  || BYUtv || 4–8 || Jessica Hubbard (5–0) || Chloe Temples (8–3) || None || 346 || 25–9 || 1–1 
|- align="center" bgcolor="ffbbb"
| April 9 || Loyola Marymount* || – || Gail Miller Field  || BYUtv || 0–1 || Jenna Perez (11–6) || Autumn Moffat-Korth (10–7) || None || 325 || 25–10 || 1–2 
|- align="center" bgcolor="ccccccc"
| April 12 || Dixie State || – || Gail Miller Field  || byutv.org || colspan=7| Canceled due to snow
|- align="center" bgcolor="ccccccc"
| April 14 || at Idaho State || – || Miller Ranch Stadium || ESPN+ || colspan=7| Canceled due to rain and freezing temperatures 
|- align="center" bgcolor="ccffccc"
| April 20 || Utah Valley || – || Gail Miller Field  || byutv.org || 2–0 || Chloe Temples (9–3) || Brooke Carter (8–7) || None || 533 || 26–10 || – 
|- align="center" bgcolor="ccffccc"
| April 22 || at San Diego* || – || USD Softball Complex  || YouTube || 5–0 || Autumn Moffat-Korth (11–7) || Courtney Rose (6–11) || None || 186 || 27–10 || 2–2 
|- align="center" bgcolor="ccffccc"
| April 23 || at San Diego* || – || USD Softball Complex  || YouTube || 7–4 || Chloe Temples (10–3) || McKenna Braegelmann (3–2) || None || 193 || 28–10 || 3–2 
|- align="center" bgcolor="ccffccc"
| April 23 || at San Diego* || – || USD Softball Complex || YouTube || 11–0 (6) || Autumn Moffat-Korth (12–7) || Ashley Daugherty (1–9) || None || 194 || 29–10 || 4–2 
|- align="center" bgcolor="ccffccc"
| April 26 || at Dixie State || – || Karl Brooks Field || ESPN+ || 8–6 || Chloe Temples (11–3) || Carissa Burgess (2–5) || Chloe Temples (1) || 243 || 30–10 || – 
|- align="center" bgcolor="ccffccc"
| April 27 || at Southern Utah || – || Kathryn Berg Field || ESPN+ || 12–0 (5) || Carley Brown (8–0) || Payton Goodrich (0–8) || Lo Salcedo (1) || 123 || 31–10 || –  
|- align="center" bgcolor="ccffccc"
| April 29 || Santa Clara* || – || Gail Miller Field  || byutv.org || 20–1 (5) || Autumn Moffat-Korth (13–7) || Regan Dias (4–10) || None || 364 || 32–10 || 5–2 
|- align="center" bgcolor="ccffccc"
| April 29 || Santa Clara* || – || Gail Miller Field  || byutv.org || 3–2 || Chloe Temples (12–3) || Hannah Edwards (6–7) || Autumn Moffat-Korth (2) || 354 || 33–10 || 6–2  
|- align="center" bgcolor="ccffccc"
| April 30 || Santa Clara* || – || Gail Miller Field  || BYUtv || 4–2 || Autumn Moffat-Korth (14–7) || Sage Hager (8–4) || Chloe Temples (2) || 479 || 34–10 || 7–2 
|-

|- align="center" bgcolor="ccccccc"
| May 3 || at Utah || – || Dumke Family Softball Field  || P12+ UTAH || colspan=7|  Cancelled- Snow
|- align="center" bgcolor="ccffccc"
| May 4 || at Utah Valley || – || Wolverine Field  || WAC DN || 10–5 || Chloe Temples (13–3) || Katie Zuniga (8–9) || None || 311 || 35–10 || – 
|- align="center" bgcolor="ccffccc"
| May 6 || at Pacific* || – || Bill Simoni Field  || SCS Atlantic || 3–0 || Autumn Moffat-Korth (15–7) || Amiyah Aponte (5–8) || None || 175 || 36–10 || 8–2 
|- align="center" bgcolor="ccffccc"
| May 6 || at Pacific* || – || Bill Simoni Field || SCS Atlantic || 10–0 || Chloe Temples (14–3) || Hannah Glad (1–6) || None || 155 || 37–10 || 9–2  
|- align="center" bgcolor="ccffccc"
| May 7 || at Pacific* || – || Bill Simoni Field || WCC Net || 11–0 (5) || Autumn Moffat-Korth (16–7) || Hannah Glad (1–7) || None || 112 || 38–10 || 10–2 
|- align="center" bgcolor="ccffccc"
| May 10 || Utah State || – || Gail Miller Field || byutv.org || 9–1 (6) || Autumn Moffat-Korth (17–7) || Kapri Toone (12–8) || None || 378 || 39–10 || – 
|- align="center" bgcolor="ccffccc"
| May 13 || Saint Mary's* || – || Gail Miller Field  || BYUtv || 15–0 (5) || Autumn Moffat-Korth (18–7) || Sofia Earle (9–13) || None || 465 || 40–10 || 11–2 
|- align="center" bgcolor="ccffccc"
| May 13 || Saint Mary's* || – || Gail Miller Field  || BYUtv || 6–1 || Chloe Temples (15–3) || Kayla Scott (4–13) || None || 465 || 41–10 || 12–2
|- align="center" bgcolor="ccffccc"
|May 14 || Saint Mary's* || – || Gail Miller Field || byutv.org || 10–0 (5) || Autumn Moffat-Korth (19–7) || Sofia Earle (9–14) || None || 589 || 42–10 || 13–2 
|-

| style="font-size:88%" | Rankings from NFCA. Parenthesis indicate tournament seedings.*West Coast Conference games

TV and Streaming Broadcast Information
UNLV: Wyatt Tomcheck 
Cal State Bakersfield: No commentary 
Hawai'i: No commentary 
Cal State Bakersfield: No commentary 
Hawai'i: No commentary 
Stanford: Joaquin Wallace & Jenna Becerra 
San Jose State: Jenna Becerra 
UC Irvine: Joaquin Wallace 
Seattle U: Joaquin Wallace & Jenna Becerra 
Bethune-Cookman: Gavin Schall
Tennessee: Gavin Schall
California Baptist: Mike Barnes, Amanda Freed, & Chelsea Reber
Long Beach State: Mike Barnes, Amanda Freed, & Chelsea Reber
San Diego State: Nick Rice
UC San Diego: Ted Mendenhall
Arizona State: Simon Williams, Ashley Stevens, & Joseph Cena
Grand Canyon: Jack O'Hara
Maine: Spencer Linton & Gary Sheide 
Idaho State: Spencer Linton & Gary Sheide 
Southern Utah DH: Jarom Jordan & Gary Sheide
Oregon: Spencer Linton & Gary Sheide 
Iowa State DH: Spencer Linton & Jason Shepherd
Iowa State: Spencer Linton & Jason Shepherd
New Mexico DH: Jason Shepherd & Rylee Jensen
New Mexico: Spencer Linton & Rylee Jensen 
Loyola Marymount DH: Spencer Linton & Rylee Jensen
Loyola Marymount: Spencer Linton & Rylee Jensen
Utah Valley: Spencer Linton & Jason Shepherd 
San Diego: No commentary
San Diego DH: No commentary
Dixie State: Keric Seegmiller
Southern Utah: Spencer McLaughlin
Santa Clara DH: Spencer Linton & Rylee Jensen
Santa Clara: Spencer Linton & Rylee Jensen
Utah Valley: Ryan Pickens & Josh Kallunki 
Pacific DH: Paul Muyskens
Pacific: Paul Muyskens
Utah State: Spencer Linton & Jason Shepherd 
Saint Mary's DH: Spencer Linton & Rylee Jensen 
Saint Mary's: Spencer Linton & Rylee Jensen

See also 
2021 BYU Cougars football team
2021–22 BYU Cougars men's basketball team
2021–22 BYU Cougars women's basketball team
2021 BYU Cougars women's soccer team
2021 BYU Cougars women's volleyball team
2022 BYU Cougars men's volleyball team
2022 BYU Cougars baseball team

External links 
 BYU Softball at byucougars.com

References 

2022 team
2022 in sports in Utah
BYU